Events in the year 2021 in Switzerland.

Incumbents 
President of the Swiss Confederation: Guy Parmelin
President of the National Council: Andreas Aebi
President of the Swiss Council of States: Alex Kuprecht

Events 
Ongoing — COVID-19 pandemic in Switzerland

1 January – The municipality of Val de Bagnes is created as a merge between the communes of Bagnes and Vollèges.
1 January – The Center is formed through the merger of the Christian Democratic People's Party of Switzerland and the Conservative Democratic Party of Switzerland.
7 March – In a March 2021 referendum, Swiss voters approved a nationwide ban on full facial coverings in public places, with over 51% of the electorate supporting it.

Deaths 
 
 

7 January – Henri Schwery, Roman Catholic cardinal, Bishop of Sion (born 1932).
11 January – Paul Kölliker, rower (born 1932).
22 January – Jacqueline Berenstein-Wavre, politician and activist (born 1921).
29 January – Robert Heuberger, businessman (born 1922).
8 March – Julien-François Zbinden, composer and jazz pianist (born 1917).
30 May – Jason Dupasquier, motorcycle road racer (born 2001).

References 

 
2020s in Switzerland
Years of the 21st century in Switzerland
Switzerland
Switzerland